The Midwives College of Utah, formerly the Utah School of Midwifery, is an institution of direct-entry midwifery training that is headquartered in Salt Lake City, Utah but offers all programs completely online. Founded in 1980, it is one of the largest and longest-standing direct-entry (out-of-hospital) midwifery programs in the nation. It has been accredited through the Midwifery Education Accreditation Council (MEAC) since 1996, which is approved by the U.S. Secretary of Education as a nationally recognized accrediting agency. The school is also accepted by the California Medical Board for state licensure.

The college offers a Bachelor of Science in Midwifery and a Master of Science in Midwifery. Students are eligible to take the North American Registry of Midwives (NARM) exam upon graduation and receive the designation of Certified Professional Midwife (CPM).

References

External links
Official website

Midwifery organizations
Private universities and colleges in Utah
Midwifery in the United States
1980 establishments in Utah
Women in Utah